The Royal Bath Hotel is a building in Bournemouth, Dorset. It is owned by Britannia Hotels and is regarded to be the towns most famous hotel. Since 1974, the hotel has been a Grade II listed building.

History 
George Tapps-Gervis built the hotel in 1838.

The hotel opened on Queen Victoria's coronation day in June 1838, becoming the first hotel in Bournemouth.

The 1878 extension was designed by Christopher Crabb Creeke.

The hotel was formerly owned by Mayor of Bournemouth Merton Russell-Cotes.

During World War II an elderly grandmother was accidentally scalded to death in a bathtub.

In 2014 there was a robbery at the hotel.

The hotel hosted a Coastal Comic Con in 2019.

References 

Hotels in Dorset
1838 establishments in England
Houses completed in 1838
Buildings and structures in Bournemouth
Tourist attractions in Bournemouth
Grade II listed buildings in Dorset
Italianate architecture in England